WD Lab Grown Diamonds ("WD") is a market leader in Chemical Vapor Deposition (CVD) diamonds, headquartered in the Washington, D.C. area. Founded in 2008, WD produces lab-grown diamonds for distribution under the brands WD Lab Grown Diamonds and Latitude, in addition to creating diamonds for high-tech Advanced Materials applications.

In 2020, WD Lab Grown Diamonds was certified Climate Neutral and achieved the highest-level of third-party Sustainability Rating through SCS Global Services, Inc.

Diamond production

WD Lab Grown Diamonds employs a proprietary and patented chemical vapor deposition (CVD) process to create laboratory-grown diamonds. WD is the exclusive licensee of a portfolio of patents covering single crystal CVD diamond growth technology, originally developed by the Geophysical Laboratory of the Carnegie Institution of Washington.

WD Lab Grown Diamonds announced its first commercially available diamonds on September 18, 2012. The company has gradually been producing larger and better quality diamonds. WD Lab Grown Diamonds first 5 carat round brilliant diamond was graded by International Gemological Institute (IGI) on June 1, 2016.  On May 22, 2018, WD Lab Grown Diamonds announced that they had produced at 9.04 carat gem-quality diamond (graded as I color VS2 clarity IDEAL cut), shattering their previous record of 6 carats (January 2018) and setting a new record for the gem quality lab grown diamond industry. 

WD Lab Grown Diamonds is focused on the gemstone market, but also services the technology sector through their Advanced Materials division. WD Lab Grown Diamonds announced in February 2018 that one of its scientific quality 6mm diamond anvils set a record when it was able to withstand 600,000 atmospheres of pressure in a lab study at Oak Ridge National Library.

History and personnel
WD Lab Grown Diamonds was founded in 2008 by Clive Hill, a successful jeweler from the United Kingdom. In January 2019, leading middle-market private equity firm Huron Capital completed an equity investment in WD Lab Grown Diamonds. In September 2019, WD Lab Grown Diamonds appointed Sue Rechner as CEO as part of a planned leadership transition. WD is jointly owned by Huron Capital, WD Management, members of its board of directors and the Carnegie Institution of Washington.

See also
List of synthetic diamond manufacturers

References

External links
https://www.wdlabgrowndiamonds.com/
https://latitudediamonds.com/ 
Mother Nature Network: Lab-grown diamonds: Would you flaunt one?
Laboratory-made diamonds a rising 'conflict-free' alternative
What a gem of an idea
Why earth mined diamond cost so much
How to Choose a Good Quality Lab Created Diamond?

Synthetic diamond
Manufacturing companies based in Washington, D.C.